Moritz Johann Bleibtreu ( is a German film actor, voice actor, and film director. Bleibtreu has been a successful actor in many movies such as Run Lola Run, Das Experiment, The Baader Meinhof Complex, and Elementary Particles. His role in Knockin' on Heaven's Door was the one that set off his career back in 1997.

Life
Moritz Bleibtreu was born in 1971 and was raised in the St. Georg district of Hamburg. Moritz Bleibtreu's parents, Monica Bleibtreu, (1944-2009) and, Hans Brenner, (1938 - 1998) were both actors.  Renato Attilio Bleibtreu is Moritz's grandfather and is a well-known writer. Many of his ancestors were actors also, such as his great-grandmother Maximiliane Bleibtreu, her sister Hedwig Bleibtreu and their parents Amalie and Sigmund Bleibtreu. Actress Cilli Drexel is the half-sister of Moritz Bleibtreu. The Bleibtreustrasse, a street in Berlin, was originally named after Georg Bleibtreu who was a battle painter and a distant ancestor of Moritz. Moritz as a child was already in the spotlight when he starred in Neues aus Uhlenbusch (News From Uhlenbusch).  The children series was written by Rainer Boldt, Monica Bleibtreu, and Hans Peter Korff. Monica and Hans were married at the time this series was produced. Bleibtreu's career continued to grow as he got a role in Boldt's, I Had a Dream, and then in 1986 in, With My Hot Tears, a television series that he acted in with his mother. 

Moritz Bleibtreu grew up attending the Jahnschule, which is now known as the Ida-Ehre-School in Hamburg-Harvestehude. He obtained his secondary school certificate in the eleventh grade while attending the school. He then began to not attend the school anymore after obtaining his certificate. Bleibtreu then moved to Paris to work as an Au-Pair for almost two years.  While working this job, he was also able to learn French. He then moved to Italy afterwards for a year and then on to New York. In New York, he attended acting school. He was not offered a job in his audition at the Actors Studio, but he was able to get on as a factotum, which let him observe the actors' rehearsals.

Moritz Bleibtreu had a son in November 2008 with his now ex-wife Annika in Reinbek, Germany.

He married Saskia de Tschaschell in Reinbeck at the Maria-Magdelenen Church on July 21, 2022.

Acting Career 
At the age of 21 and after 4 years of studying abroad, Bleibtreu continued his career by working at the Thalia Theater and the Schauspielhaus in Hamburg, Germany. After this, he began getting smaller roles in television series. Moritz Bleibtreu began his television acting career in 1993 with a role in the series Schulz & Schulz. In the show, he helps a 16-year-old boy with a predicament with his father. They seek to prove his father's innocence after he is convicted of killing a young man who resided in the red-light district in Hamburg. Bleibtreu also starred in a romantic comedy called Talk of the Town (1995). He played the role of Karl, a homosexual naive carpenter.

In 1998, Moritz began to step away from acting in T.V. series and began to work on more movies. He said, "cinema is an active form of watching, while television is a passive one". Bleibtreu has worked in many well-known films such as Run Lola Run, Knockin' on Heaven's Door, The Baader Meinhof Complex, and The Experiment. He also worked on many other films such as Solino, im Juli, Chiko, and Soul Kitchen in which he worked with filmmaker Fatih Akin. Moritz won the German Film Award for best leading actor in the films im Juli and The Experiment. In 2003, he was a member of the jury at the 25th Moscow International Film Festival. Bleibtreu also worked in many films as a voice actor. In 2004 and 2006, he was a voice actor in the film Brother Bear and Brother Bear 2 which were both produced by Walt Disney Studios. He was also awarded the Silver Bear for Best Actor in 2006 for his role in Elementary Particles directed by Oskar Roehler. He also enjoys taking smaller supporting roles in international co-productions. One movie that he worked in was Sam Barbarski's Vijay and I. Bleibtreu, back in 2004, played a role in the Danish film Der Fakir and then in 2016 in Johannes Naber's film adaptation of Wilhelm Hauff's Heart of Stone. Finally, in February 2015, he stepped back into the TV production spotlight after 17 years. He started  acting in the ZDF crime series called Schuld. The TV series was based on Ferdinand von Schriach. Bleibtreu played the role of Friedrich Kronberg, a criminal defense lawyer, for three seasons. Following wide positive feedback by fans on his Facebook page whether there should be a sequel to the 2001 classic German stoner film Lammbock, Bleibtreu announced in November 2015 that the sequel would be titled Lommbock. Filming began in summer 2016 and the film premiered in 2017. He played a main role in the musical adaptation, "I've Never Been to New York", which was first shown in cinemas in Germany in October 2019. He worked alongside a couple other famous actors and actresses such as Katharina Thalbach, Heike Makatsch, and Uwe Ochsenknecht in movies such as I've Never Been to New York and Love Your Neighbour.  Bleibtreu then began his journey as a director in September 2020 with his film "Cortex". He premiered his film at the Hamburg Film Festival in October 2020. The next year he worked in a six-part RTL and drama series called "Faking Hitler".

Selected filmography

Awards

Directing Career 
Moritz Bleibtreu began his career in directing in 2019 with his film Cortex which released in theaters on October 22, 2020. He said in an interview with the German Films Quarterly that the film was "very personal to him" as he directed the psychological thriller. Bleibtreu exclaimed that the motivation behind him directing his film was that "... he believed he wanted to watch like this himself". He also said that "directing was not an escape from acting, but rather just another challenge for his journey". Not only did Bleibtreu direct the film, but he also played the lead role of a security officer named Hagen. According to IMDb with 540 viewer ratings, Cortex received a 5.3 out of 10 stars.  German film critic, Christopher Diekhaus, said in a review that "Bleibtreu finds his own way to challenge and captivate the audience". He also says it "creates an abysmal pull and makes you want to watch it several times to better understand the dance between dream and reality".

Controversy 
Moritz Bleibtreu, in 2013, did a commercial for a popular fast-food chain with actors and actresses including Christian Ulmen, Elyas M'Barek, Alexandra Maria Lara, and many others. He said that the reason that he did the commercial for the fast-food chain was because it allowed him to "make small budget films" and he also enjoyed eating at the fast-food chain itself.

Bleibtreu decided in April 2021 to join the #allesdichtmachen campaign. This campaign was meant for people to give advice or measures that they would take to stop COVID-19 from spreading. There were about 50 other actors along with Bleibtreu that joined in on this movement. When an advertising partner decided to step in and talk to him about how this could affect his career and future, he decided it was best to not send out the video that he made for the campaign.

References

External links

 
 

1971 births
Living people
German people of Austrian descent
German male film actors
German male television actors
Male actors from Munich
Silver Bear for Best Actor winners
20th-century German male actors
21st-century German male actors